Scolland of Canterbury also known as Scotland was the abbot of St Augustine's Abbey during the Norman conquest of England.

He was an aid of Lanfranc, the Archbishop of Canterbury.

He conducted building works at his abbey and promoted the veneration of Augustine in Canterbury.

Career
As a key aid of Bishop Lanfranc he was closely involved in the primacy debate between Lanfranc and Thomas of Bayeux, Bishop of York. He was sent as an ambassador to Rome in 1073 where he advocated for Augustin's role as apostle to the English, a doctrine that greatly assisted the case for Canterbury primacy.
 
In 1072 he signed the statement of the Council of London 1075. at which the bishop Lanfranc blessed him.

Scolland, also rebuilt many of the Abbey buildings in the Romanesque style.

He died in 1087 and was replaced by Wido. The monks of the Abbey however rebelled against Wido, and were expelled from the monastery and several were arrested.

Historical attestation
Scolland is mentioned in the Doomesday Book, where he is listed as Tenant-in-chief of numerous small lots in Kent.

He  witnessed a number of deeds of William the Conqueror, and he is listed in the "regesta regum anglo-normannorum".

He appears in the Vita of St Dunstan.

The Bayeux Tapestry
 The abbot  had been head monk in the scriptorium of Abbey of Mont Saint-Michel and carried much of the techniques developed in France to Canterbury. as well as importing a number of manuscripts from France.

Howard B. Clarke has proposed that Scolland was the designer of the tapestry, because of his previous position as head of the scriptorium at Mont Saint-Michel, his travels to Trajan's Column, and his connections to Wadard and Vital, two individuals identified in the tapestry.

Historian Richard Gameson  has suggested that a monk depicted in the Bayeux Tapestry and pointing at the Abbey of Mont Saint-Michel is Abbot Scolland.

References

1087 deaths
Year of birth unknown
Anglo-Normans
Norman conquest of England